Anne Tucker McGuire (29 January 1913 in Winchester, Virginia, USA - 3 August 1988 in London, England) was an American-born actress who appeared largely in British films and television. She married actor Tom Macaulay.

She appeared in the 1949 West End musical Her Excellency.

In 1952 she played Patrick Barr 's assistant and secretary in the seven-part British television series, 'Inspector Morley: Late of Scotland Yard', which also starred Dorothy Bramhall; Arthur Howard; Tod Slaughter; and Johnny Briggs.

In 1958, she appeared as Margaret "Molly" Brown in the film A Night to Remember, about the infamous ocean liner Titanic. According to director Roy Ward Baker, McGuire was the only cast member who caused him any trouble on the film, describing her as "ornery," and saying "I don't know what got into her."

Filmography

References

External links

1913 births
1988 deaths
American film actresses
British actresses
People from Winchester, Virginia
20th-century American actresses
American emigrants to the United Kingdom